Flint Laboratory is an academic building and a former dairy laboratory at the University of Massachusetts Amherst. It was the first building of the Ellis Drive "agricultural group", including Stockbridge Hall and an unbuilt hall for agricultural mechanics. At the time of its completion, the laboratory was considered to be "one of the best equipped dairy buildings in the United States" and was described as "a model for the whole country" in one edition of the Works Progress Administration guidebook to Massachusetts. The building was named after Charles L. Flint, the university's fourth president, the first secretary of the state board of agriculture, a lecturer on dairy farming, and a prolific agricultural writer who wrote a well-received textbook on "Milch Cows" in the late 19th century.

Today the building has been almost entirely converted to office space for the university's Department of Hospitality and Tourism Management, however the former "dairy bar" has been repurposed as a restaurant known as Fletcher's Café, which is run by students of the hospitality program.

References

See also
 Charles L. Flint
 Ellis Drive Historical Area

University of Massachusetts Amherst buildings
School buildings completed in 1912
Dairy buildings in the United States
1912 establishments in Massachusetts
Agricultural buildings and structures in Massachusetts